"Nightmare" is a song by American singer Halsey. It was released as a single on May 17, 2019 and was sent to top 40 radio on May 21, 2019 through Capitol Records. The song was written by Halsey along with its producers Benny Blanco, Cashmere Cat, and Happy Perez. The music video, directed by Hannah Lux Davis, accompanied its release the same day. The song was added as a bonus track on the extended version of Halsey's fourth studio album If I Can't Have Love, I Want Power.

Composition
"Nightmare" is written in the key A minor with 146 beats per minute. The song contains an interpolation of "All the Things She Said" by Russian duo t.A.T.u. Elena Kiper, one of the songwriters of t.A.T.u's song, posted on her Instagram that an initial version of Halsey's track "contained an extensive interpolation of the original work" but later the sample was changed by G-Eazy, although the latter isn't credited on the work.

Promotion
In May 2019, Halsey posted a link on her social media, directing users to the website "nightma.re" to sign up for email alerts and prompting them to share what their worst nightmare is. The site gave a series of options, and upon clicking one of the options, users would be shown an explanation as to the meaning of that specific nightmare. Fans also believed that the time tickets for her recent intimate concerts went on sale, 5:17 PM, was a hint towards the date new music would be released, although Halsey claimed no knowledge of this and only said new music would be coming "sooner than you think". She then announced the single's release date on Twitter on May 9, 2019, posting a video of her revealing the title at one of her concerts, and captioning it "new single. NIGHTMARE. may 17th". Several days later, Halsey announced she had hidden lyrics of the song in five US cities: Los Angeles, Dallas, Chicago, San Francisco, and New York City.

On May 20, 2019, Halsey performed a free show for fans in Minneapolis, where she performed the single live for the first time, along with "Castle", "Gasoline", "Without Me" and "Don't Play". She uploaded a video of some of the performances on YouTube following the show.

Music video
The music video for "Nightmare" premiered on YouTube on May 16, 2019. Directed by Hannah Lux Davis, the video features appearances by Cara Delevingne, Debbie Harry, Ryan Destiny, and Suki Waterhouse.

Critical reception
The song has received positive reviews. Billboard magazine said the song is musically "unorthodox" containing "stylistic curveballs" and "killer lines" that "exalt autonomy, sexual freedom and self-acceptance". The line "I've been polite, but I won't be caught dead/ Letting a man tell me what I should do in my bed" was noted as a "barbed assault on patriarchal expectation" by Billboard and "a necessary gesture of rage and empowerment" by Rolling Stone. Billboard named it the 17th best song of 2019.

Credits and personnel
Credits adapted from Tidal.
 Halsey – vocals, songwriting
 Benny Blanco – production, songwriting, record engineering, keyboards, programming
 Cashmere Cat – production, songwriting, keyboards, programming
 Happy Perez – production, songwriting, guitar, programming
 Elena Kiper – songwriting
 Ivan Nikolaevich Shapovalov – songwriting
 Martin Kierszenbaum – songwriting
 Sergio Galoyan – songwriting
 Trevor Horn – songwriting
 Valerij Valentinovich Polienko – songwriting
 John Hanes – mixing engineering
 Serban Ghenea – mixing
 Chris Gehringer – mastering engineering

Awards and nominations

Charts

Weekly charts

Year-end charts

Certifications

Nightmare (reprise) 

"Nightmare (reprise)" is a song by Halsey included on the Walmart bonus track edition of her fourth studio album If I Can't Have Love, I Want Power (2021). The song is a re-produced version of "Nightmare" created to match the sound of the album. It was first teased by Walmart when a 25 second snippet of a censored version of the song was posted to their website as promotional material for their Walmart exclusive version of the album. It was later added to the extended edition of the album along with "People Disappear Here" and the original "Nightmare".

Release history

References

2019 singles
2019 songs
Capitol Records singles
Halsey (singer) songs
Music videos directed by Hannah Lux Davis
Songs written by Benny Blanco
Songs written by Cashmere Cat
Songs written by Halsey (singer)
Songs written by Happy Perez
Songs written by Martin Kierszenbaum
Songs written by Trevor Horn
Songs written by Elena Kiper
Song recordings produced by Benny Blanco
Song recordings produced by Cashmere Cat
Songs about nightmares